Sangeet Marathi is India's first, Marathi language television channel that plays non-stop Marathi music. The channel is headquartered in Mumbai, India and is owned by Media Worldwide Limited, which owns three other music channels - Music India - a popular Hindi music channel, Sangeet Bangla - a channel that plays popular Bengali music and Sangeet Bhojpuri, which plays hit Bhojpuri music. As of December 2015, Sangeet Marathi reached  approximately 11 thousand households across India.

History
Sangeet Marathi was launched on 18 September 2015 as a free-to-air channel available across all major cable and DTH platforms as well as online.

About
Sangeet Marathi broadcasts a mix of retro, devotional, romantic, and peppy numbers and contemporary music, catering to a wide audience.

The channel is India's first celebrity-driven TV channel and is headed by Deepak Dewoolkar - a very well known face in the Marathi film industry. Owing to the diverse audience base and large audience that it enjoys, Sangeet Marathi caters to a pan-India audience.

References

External links
Official Website

Music television channels in India
Television channels and stations established in 2015
Television stations in Mumbai
2015 establishments in Maharashtra
Marathi-language television channels